Chack Diyalla or Chakdyala is a village in the Indian union territory of Jammu and Kashmir. It is located in Hiranagar tehsil of Kathua district.

Demography
According to 2011 census, Chack Dayala has total of 187 families residing with a population of 943 of which 495 were males while 448 were females. Average Sex Ratio of Chack Diyalla village is 905 which is higher than Jammu and Kashmir state average of 889. Literacy rate of the village was 86.08% higher than state literacy of 67.16%. Male literacy stands at 92.27% while the female literacy rate was 79.45%.

Other general and backward caste (OBC) constitutes 91% of the total population in Chak Diyalla village. The village Chack Diyalla currently doesn't have any Schedule Tribe population.

Transport
Chack Dayala is 5 km away from tehsil headquarter Hiranagar. While it is 64 km from winter capital Jammu city. Chak Dayala village has railway station.

Religious worships 

There is also a temple in the town, Mata Vaishno Mandir Langerial (Shri Swami Vishno Puri JI Maharaj Mandir).

References

Villages in Hiranagar tehsil